Eilema paupercula is a moth of the subfamily Arctiinae found on Madagascar. It was described by Hervé de Toulgoët in 1965.

References

 

paupercula
Moths described in 1965